The Open Mobile Radio Interface (OMRI) is a technical interface that standardizes the communication between a phone's SoC and the apps running on it for specific digital radio / DAB+ related functionalities. It is designed to ensure that any compatible DAB+ app will work on any smartphone with the capable hardware. It was revealed 12 September 2016, at the IBC in Amsterdam.

See also 
 DAB+

References

External links 
 https://github.com/ebu/OpenMobileRadioInterface
 https://dl.dropboxusercontent.com/u/58546064/OMRI_pressrelease_IBC_IDAG.pdf

Digital radio